Sir Walden Hanmer, 1st Baronet  (1717–1783) was a British lawyer and politician who sat in the House of Commons between 1768 and 1780.

Early life
Hanmer was the only son of Job Hanmer, bencher of Lincoln's Inn and his wife Susanna Walden, daughter of Thomas Walden of Simpson, Buckinghamshire, and was baptised on 19 March 1717. He was  educated at Eton College and entered Lincoln's Inn in 1732. He matriculated at Balliol College, Oxford on 12 June 1736. In 1739 he succeeded his father. He was called to the bar in 1741. He married Anne Graham, daughter of Henry Vere Graham of Holbrook, Suffolk, sometime before 1747. In 1758 he became a bencher of Lincolns Inn  He retired early from practice as a barrister and became a magistrate in several counties.

Political career
Hanmer first stood for Parliament in 1761 at Bedford but withdrew after the first day's polling. He applied for a Welsh judgeship in 1766  but was unsuccessful. After considering standing for Bedford again in 1768 he stood instead at Sudbury where he was returned as  Member of Parliament  after a contest. In 1773 he succeeded to Hanmer estates in Flintshire on the death of his cousin Humphrey Hanmer, and was created baronet on 21 May 1774. He stood again at Sudbury at the 1774 general election  but was defeated in a contest. He was then seated on petition on 22 March 1775.  He did not stand in the 1780 general election

Later life
Hanmer died on 20 October 1783. He was succeeded in the baronetcy by his son Thomas.

References

1717 births
1783 deaths
Alumni of Balliol College, Oxford
Members of Lincoln's Inn
Members of the Parliament of Great Britain for English constituencies
British MPs 1768–1774
British MPs 1774–1780
Baronets in the Baronetage of Great Britain
People educated at Eton College
English barristers